One Way Trip 3D is a 2011 Austrian-Swiss 3D horror film directed by Markus Welter.

Cast
 Sabrina Reiter as Valerie
 Melanie Winiger as Marlene
 Herbert Leiser as Pius
 Martin Loos as Robert
 Aaron Hitz as Mike
 Matthias Britschgi as Lars
 Simon Kaeser as Thomas
 Isabelle Barth as Sarah
 Harry Lampl as Timo
 Tanja Raunig as Lilli

References

External links
 

2011 films
2011 3D films
Swiss horror films
2010s German-language films
2011 horror films
Austrian slasher films
Austrian horror films